Palm Beach Central High School is a high school located in Wellington, Florida in the Palm Beach County School District. Opened in 2003, Palm Beach Central currently has over 3,000 students (2,966 in the 2019-20 school year) enrolled in grades nine through twelve. The school offers a wide variety of athletics, arts programs, and extracurricular activities, as well as four distinct tracks which students must apply for. The school's mascot is the bronco, or bucking horse.

Tracks

 Culinary arts
 Engineering
 Web design
 Cybersecurity

Athletics

 Baseball
 Bowling
 Cross country
 Cheerleading
 Flag football
 Football
 Girls basketball
 Golf
 Lacrosse
 Marching band
 Soccer
 Softball
 Swimming
 Tennis
 Track
 Volleyball
 Weightlifting
 Wrestling

Notable alumni
Jon Bostic – American football linebacker
Juan D. Cardona - U.S. Navy Surface Warfare Officer
K. C. McDermott - American football player
Pat O'Donnell – American football punter
Brad Peacock – baseball pitcher
Bobby Poyner – baseball pitcher
Devon Travis – baseball second baseman
FlightReacts - YouTuber, musician, and social media commentator; real name Kimani White

References

External links
 

High schools in Palm Beach County, Florida
Public high schools in Florida
Wellington, Florida
Educational institutions established in 2003
2003 establishments in Florida